Break Down Barriers is an EP released by San Francisco new wave group Translator in 1983. The 3 tracks from this record were included as bonus tracks on the No Time Like Now CD release.

In 1996, many Beatles fans mistook this EP's take of the instrumental "Cry for a Shadow" for a new recording by the Fab Four from the Anthology sessions. Coincidentally, the EP's producer, David Kahne, would later produce records for Beatle Paul McCartney.

Track listing

"Break Down Barriers" (Extended Mix)
"Eraser"
"Cry for a Shadow"

References

1983 debut EPs
Albums produced by David Kahne
Translator (band) albums
415 Records EPs